Abdel Rahim Mohammed Hussein (born 1949) is a Sudanese politician and the former Governor of Khartoum State. Hussein served as the longstanding Minister of National Defense of The Republic of Sudan. Hussein also served for a period as the Minister of Interior Affairs. During his term as Minister of Interior Affairs, he opened the Rabat University. Hussein was arrested in early April 2019 following a coup on 11 April which overthrew al-Bashir.

Early life
Hussein was born in 1949 Karam, part of Northern State, In 1964 he began his secondary education in Elburgig (البرقيق ). It was here that he became an Islamist.

Military career
He joined the Sudanese Air Force in the 1973, .Hussein graduated from the prestigious Cranfield University in the United Kingdom with a master's degree in aeronautical engineering in 1982. He played a major role in the 1989 Sudanese coup d'état, and afterwards in 1990 became Secretary-General of the Revolutionary Command Council for National Salvation; the ruling authority of Sudan between 1989 and 1993.

Politics

Interior Minister
Following the dissolution of the Revolutionary Command Council for National Salvation he was appointed Minister of Interior Affairs by President Bashir, a position through which he dominated Sudan's internal security services.

Despite being a strong Islamist, Hussein remained a loyal Bashir supporter following Bashir's rift with Hassan al-Turabi; the leader of the National Islamic Front, and quite possibly the most influential Sudanese Islamist, who had supported Bashir in his 1989 coup attempt.

Hussein has recognised the major role Turabi played in the formation of the ideology that led the 1989 coup attempt, and spoke in 2002 about how although disliked the rift with Turabi due to the intellectual and political debt they owed him, Turabi's imprisonment was in fact necessary to protect the state that Turabi had advocated for.

In 2004 President Bashir appointed Hussein as his special representative for Darfur. He held this position until 2005.

Minister of Defence
He became the Minister of National Defense in 2005, he held the position till 2015.

In his time Sudanese army became the third in Africa after South Africa and Egypt.

During his time, a remarkable development took place in the Sudanese army in terms of  individual, equipment, and work environment.

He is considered one of the strongest defense ministers who passed through the Ministry of Defense in Sudan.

War crimes allegations
On 2 December 2011, the Prosecutor of the International Criminal Court of the investigating the situation in Darfur, Luis Moreno Ocampo, requested a Pre-Trial Chamber of the Court to issue an arrest warrant against Abdel Rahim Mohammed Hussein for war crimes and crimes against humanity.

On March 1, 2012, the ICC issued an arrest warrant for Hussein, charging with 20 counts of crimes against humanity and 21 counts of war crimes.

2019 arrest
On 11 April 2019, al-Bashir was overthrown in a coup and Hussein was soon afterwards arrested. On 27 May 2020, Sudan’s public prosecution service announced that Hussein had tested positive for COVID-19 and was subsequently placed in quarantine.

References

External links 
Black voter network on Sudan

BashirWatch

Living people
Defense ministers of Sudan
Interior ministers of Sudan
Sudanese lieutenant generals
Fugitives wanted by the International Criminal Court
1949 births
People from Northern (state)
Alumni of Cranfield University